Erickson Patrick Correia Andrade (born 9 February 1993) is a Cape Verdean footballer who plays as a midfielder for Serbian club Partizan and the Cape Verde national team.

Club career
On 14 January 2015, Andrade made his professional debut with Moreirense in a 2014–15 Taça da Liga match against Nacional.

On 26 June 2018, Andrade signed with Bulgarian club Cherno More. On 30 July, he made his official debut in a 2–2 away draw against Levski Sofia.

On 28 August 2020, Andrade signed a three-year contract with Qarabağ FK.

International career
On 1 October 2020, Andrade was called by Cape Verde. Andrade first represented the Cape Verde national team in a friendly 2-1 loss to Guinea on 10 October 2020.
He was named in the roster for the 2021 Africa Cup of Nations when the team reached the round of 16..

References

External links
 
 Stats and profile at LPFP 
 

1993 births
Sportspeople from Praia
Living people
Cape Verdean footballers
Cape Verde international footballers
Association football midfielders
Sporting Clube da Praia players
G.D. Ribeirão players
G.D. Joane players
Liga Portugal 2 players
Primeira Liga players
First Professional Football League (Bulgaria) players
Azerbaijan Premier League players
Serbian SuperLiga players
Moreirense F.C. players
F.C. Famalicão players
S.C. Salgueiros players
PFC Cherno More Varna players
Qarabağ FK players
FK Partizan players
Cape Verdean expatriate footballers
Cape Verdean expatriate sportspeople in Portugal
Expatriate footballers in Portugal
Cape Verdean expatriate sportspeople in Bulgaria
Expatriate footballers in Bulgaria
Expatriate footballers in Azerbaijan
Expatriate footballers in Serbia
2021 Africa Cup of Nations players